Nicholas Murray may refer to:

 Nicholas Murray (Presbyterian) (1802–1861), Moderator of the General Assembly of the Presbyterian Church
 Nicholas Murray (biographer), British biographer, poet and journalist
 Nick Murray (musician), American drummer
 Nick Murray (footballer) (born 2000), Australian rules footballer

See also
 Nickolas Muray (1892–1965), Hungarian-born American photographer and saber fencer